Government Engineering College, Bilaspur (GEC Bilaspur) is a Public engineering college located in Bilaspur, Chhattisgarh, India. Established in 1964, it is affiliated to Chhattisgarh Swami Vivekanand Technical University, Bhilai. It is one of four Government Engineering College in Chhattisgarh along with Government Engineering College Raipur and [[Government Engineering College, Jagdalpur][Government Engineering College , Ambikapur]].

History
It was established 1964, it was earlier affiliated to Pandit Ravishankar Shukla University, Raipur. The first academic session started on July, 1964 and the first batch passed out in the year 1969. In 2005, College became affiliated to newly formed Chhattisgarh Swami Vivekanand Technical University, Bhilai.

Government Engineering College Bilaspur, is a provider of University level technical education and research in Chhattisgarh state. The institute is affiliated to Chhattisgarh Swami Vivekanand Technical University (CSVTU), Bhilai and approved by All India Council for Technical Education (AICTE), Delhi. Since its inception in 1964, college is a dynamic, fast growing educational institution. College provides a safe and supportive environment to foster the academic development and welfare of students. Imbibed with the message of “Yogah Karmasu Kaushalam”, the institute is offering a flexible and real world based approach in education.

Location
This college is located on Korba road amidst the peaceful Koni village occupying an area of 179 acres of land.

Departments
Mining Engineering
Information Technology
Civil Engineering
Mechanical Engineering
Electrical Engineering
Computer Science Engineering
Electronics & Telecommunication Engineering

References

Schools of mines in India
Government universities and colleges in India
Engineering colleges in Chhattisgarh
Education in Bilaspur, Chhattisgarh
Educational institutions established in 1964
1964 establishments in Madhya Pradesh